Eungai (postcode 2441) is a town on the mid-North Coast of New South Wales, Australia. It is made up of two localities, Eungai Creek and Eungai Rail, although both have the same postcode. The Eungai district is midway between Sydney (500 km) and Brisbane, midway between Port Macquarie (90 km) and Coffs Harbour, and midway between Kempsey (20 km) and Macksville. (see ) It is in the Nambucca Valley.

Railway Station
Eungai railway station is located on the North Coast railway line, and is served by the daily Sydney to Grafton XPT and the Grafton to Sydney XPT. Trains only stop at this station if there is a booking for pick up or set down due to the small population of the town and low standard of facilities at the station.

References 

Towns in New South Wales